A Wish Comes True is Jolina Magdangal's debut studio album released on 1996 by Walt Disney Records and distributed by Universal Records.

Magdangal was the first Filipino recording artist of Walt Disney in the Philippines.

Track listing

Personnel 
Adapted from the A Wish Comes True liner notes.

 Bella D. Tan – executive producer
 Ito Rapadas – producer
 Henry Garcia – arranger (tracks 2, 5)
 Albert Tamayo – arranger (tracks 6, 7, 9)
 Alvin Nunez – arranger (tracks 1, 3, 8, 10)
 Frederick Garcia – arranger (track 6)
 Erwin dela Cruz – arranger (track 4)
 Babsie Molina – back-up vocals
 Moy Ortiz – back-up vocals
 Katherine Molina – back-up vocals
 Sylvia Macaraeg – back-up vocals
 Elize Cortez – back-up vocals (tracks 4, 5)
 Abe Hipolito – guitars
 Boyet Navajas – guitars (tracks 4, 6)
 Jerry Joanino – mixing engineer, pink noise recording studio
 Raymund Isaac – photography
 Joanne Pe – album cover design

References

1996 debut albums
Jolina Magdangal albums
Walt Disney Records albums